Chaucheprat Point is a low headland at the northwest corner of Jonassen Island in Antarctic Sound. The name "Cap Chaucheprat", after M. Chaucheprat, Private Secretary to Vice Admiral Claude de Rosamel, was applied to a feature in this vicinity by Captain Jules Dumont d'Urville in 1838. The present name revives the d'Urville naming, which probably was related to the heights of Jonassen Island.

References
 

Headlands of the Joinville Island group